IODE may refer to:

 Imperial Order Daughters of the Empire, a Canadian women's organization
 International Oceanographic Data and Information Exchange, a worldwide network that operates under the auspices of the Intergovernmental Oceanographic Commission

See also
 iodéOS, an Android operating system